A List of Czech films of the 1980s.

1980s
Czech
Films